Ceryx alenina is a moth of the subfamily Arctiinae. It was described by Strand in 1912. It is found in Equatorial Guinea.

References

Ceryx (moth)
Moths described in 1912
Insects of Cameroon
Moths of Africa